Ronald Jayson Buenafe (born May 27, 1983) is a Filipino professional basketball player for the Valenzuela XUR Homes Realty Inc. of the Maharlika Pilipinas Basketball League (MPBL).

Professional career
Being called as the "steal" of the 2007 draft, he performed well during his rookie season as a scoring guard. With the help of the then newly acquired Asi Taulava, they led the Tigers past the wildcard and faced the Alaska Aces in the quarterfinals where they lost 3-0. The following conference, their team had a more successful eliminations compiling a 10-8 record. Once again, they ended their run at the quarterfinals, this time at the hands of the Magnolia Beverage Masters. At the end of the season, Buenafe was named to the All-Rookie Team and was among the contenders for Rookie of the Year.

On his second season, he duplicated his performance though it didn't translate to wins for Coca-Cola.

For the 2009–10 season, Buenafe was acquired by the Burger King Whoppers. He played alongside Gary David and Wynne Arboleda. Despite stellar performances, his team still was not able to make the playoffs.

In the middle of the 2010–11 season, Buenafe was involved in a three-way trade where he, Ronnie Matias and Beau Belga were all traded to the Rain or Shine Elasto Painters. Though he still provided what the team needed, his numbers went down.

Before the 2012–13 season, he got traded again, this time to the Meralco Bolts in exchange for its 2014 first-round draft pick and provide offensive firepower alongside the backcourt duo of Sol Mercado and Mark Cardona.

PBA career statistics

Correct as of September 24, 2016

Season

|-
| align="left" | 
| align="left" | Coca-Cola
| 42 || 24.6 || .369 || .317 || .816 || 2.4 || 2.0 || 1.1 || .2 || 11.2
|-
| align="left" | 
| align="left" | Coca-Cola
| 32 || 23.4 || .406 || .357 || .825 || 2.8 || 1.6 || .8 || .1 || 11.1
|-
| align="left" | 
| align="left" | Burger King / Air21
| 38 || 27.7 || .358 || .291 || .818 || 2.8 || 2.2 || 1.2 || .1 || 13.3
|-
| align="left" | 
| align="left" | Air21 / Rain or Shine
| 40 || 23.0 || .415 || .382 || .777 || 1.8 || 1.4 || .8 || .1 || 12.4
|-
| align="left" | 
| align="left" | Rain or Shine
| 53 || 19.5 || .367 || .290 || .799 || 1.7 || 1.2 || .7 || .1 || 8.3
|-
| align="left" | 
| align="left" | Meralco
| 43 || 23.7 || .345 || .328 || .806 || 2.4 || 1.1 || .6 || .2 || 9.5
|-
| align="left" | 
| align="left" | Barako Bull
| 34 || 20.1 || .371 || .331 || .712 || 1.8 || 1.3 || .8 || .1 || 7.9
|-
| align="left" | 
| align="left" | GlobalPort
| 36 || 17.7 || .341 || .306 || .660 || 2.4 || .6 || .6 || .1 || 6.5
|-
| align="left" | 
| align="left" | Meralco / Phoenix
| 22 || 8.6 || .418 || .372 || 1.000 || .9 || .5 || .1 || .1 || 3.7
|-class=sortbottom
| align=center colspan=2 | Career
| 340 || 21.5 || .373 || .325 || .793 || 2.1 || 1.4 || .8 || .1 || 9.6

References 

1983 births
Living people
Barako Bull Energy players
Blackwater Bossing players
Filipino men's basketball players
NorthPort Batang Pier players
Meralco Bolts players
EAC Generals basketball players
NLEX Road Warriors players
Phoenix Super LPG Fuel Masters players
Powerade Tigers players
Rain or Shine Elasto Painters players
Shooting guards
Basketball players from Quezon City
Maharlika Pilipinas Basketball League players
Powerade Tigers draft picks